Birgitta Lillpers (born 14 February 1958) is a Swedish poet and novelist. Among her poetry collections are Silverskåp from 2000 and  Nu försvinner vi eller ingår from 2007. Among her novels are Blomvattnarna from 1987 and Medan de ännu hade hästar from 1993. She was awarded the Dobloug Prize in 2001 and the Grand De Nio Prize in 2008. She was awarded the Bellman Prize in 2011.

Selected works
Stämnoja, poetry collection, 1982
Igenom: härute, poetry collection, 1984 
Gry, och bärga, poetry collection, 1986 
Blomvattnarna, novel, 1987
I bett om vatten, poetry collection, 1988
Besök på en främmande kennel, poetry collection, 1990 
Iris, Isis och skräddaren, novel, 1991 
Krigarna i den här provinsen, poetry collection, 1992
Medan de ännu hade hästar, novel, 1993
Propolis, poetry collection, 1995
Och jag grep årorna och rodde, novel, 1998
Silverskåp, poetry collection, 2000
Alla dessa liv och våder, novel, 2002
Glömde väl inte ljusets element när du räknade, poetry collection, 2004
Dikter från betet, poetry collection, 2006
Nu försvinner vi eller ingår, poetry collection, 2007
Om du fick tänka dig ett hem, novel, 2010

References

1958 births
Living people
20th-century Swedish novelists
20th-century Swedish poets
20th-century Swedish women writers
21st-century Swedish poets
21st-century Swedish novelists
21st-century Swedish women writers
Dobloug Prize winners
Swedish women poets
Swedish women novelists